Chalu Deso Gelmisa (born ) is a long-distance runner from Ethiopia.  He won the 2022 Paris Marathon and the 2023 Tokyo Marathon.

Career
In 2017, Deso took part in the Route du Vin Half Marathon in Luxembourg, finishing in twelfth place with a time of 1:08:06.

In 2019, Deso placed second in the Castellón Marathon. He finished with a time of 2:13:12, nearly five minutes behind his compatriot Andualem Belay, who won the marathon. Eight months later, Deso won the 2019 Porto Marathon with a finish time of 2:09:08, nearly two minutes ahead of the second-place finisher.

Deso set his personal best at the 2020 Valencia Marathon, which was held during the coronavirus pandemic and restricted to elite athletes.  His finish time of 2:04:53 placed him sixth on the list of finishers.  Deso returned to Valencia in later years, finishing second in 2021 with a time of 2:05:16.  He lost by four seconds in a sprint finish to Kenyan Lawrence Cherono, who passed both Deso and third-place finisher Philemon Kacheran in the last  of the race.  Deso also ran the 2022 Valencia Marathon, placing sixth with a time of 2:04:56, three seconds slower than his personal record.  He ran with the lead pack for most of the race, which was won by Kenyan Kelvin Kiptum in 2:01:53, the fastest debut marathon time ever.

In 2022, Deso won the Paris Marathon with a time of 2:05:07, sprinting to finish just three seconds ahead of compatriot Seifu Tura, who took second place.  He ran the Sydney Marathon later that year, taking third place with a time of 2:07:09.  That year, all three podium finishers had broken the previous Australian all-comers marathon record of 2:07:50.

Deso won the 2023 Tokyo Marathon with a sprint finish, beating compatriot Mohamed Esa by less than a second.  Both Deso and Esa recorded a time of 2:05:22, and were closely followed by Ethiopian Tsegaye Getachew, whose time of 2:05:25 rounded out an Ethiopian podium sweep.

References

External links 
 

1997 births
Living people
21st-century Ethiopian people
Ethiopian male long-distance runners
Ethiopian male marathon runners
Paris Marathon male winners
Tokyo Marathon male winners

it:Deso Gelmisa